Archibald Ernest Swannie (5 June 1875 – 29 May 1941) was an Australian rules footballer who played for the South Melbourne Football Club in the Victorian Football League (VFL).

Commencing his football career with Hawthorn (not the current AFL club) he played a game for Melbourne in 1895 before spending two years with South Melbourne (1896–1897), including their first year in the VFL.

In 1898 he returned to Hawthorn before moving to West Melbourne halfway through the season. He then moved to Port Melbourne for the 1899 VFA season and was a member of their 1901 premiership team. His final game for Port came at the end of the 1902 season, when it was reported that he was moving to Queensland.

In 1899 he was awarded the bronze medal of the Royal Humane Society for saving the life of Maud Fazackerly, who jumped into the Yarra River near Queen's Bridge in Melbourne.

In late 1902 he married Alice Josephine Shea and after a few years in Queensland and New South Wales they returned to Victoria and lived in the Essendon region of Melbourne. He died on 29 May 1941 at Sacred Heart Private Hospital, Moreland, after a brief illness.

References

External links 

1875 births
1941 deaths
Australian rules footballers from Victoria (Australia)
Sydney Swans players
West Melbourne Football Club players
Port Melbourne Football Club players